Henry N. "Hank" Kuhlmann (born October 6, 1937) is a former American football coach, and was the interim head coach for the National Football League's Phoenix Cardinals for part of the 1989 season. He assumed the position after Gene Stallings announced his retirement in November. Stallings had intended to finish the season, but general manager Larry Wilson ordered him to leave immediately, believing Stallings would be too much of a distraction.  Kuhlmann finished with an 0-5 record, and was replaced by Joe Bugel before the start of the following season.

Kuhlmann played fullback for the Missouri Tigers football team from 1956 to 1958 under coaches Don Faurot, Frank Broyles, and Dan Devine.  He led the Tigers in rushing and in scoring the 1956 and 1957 seasons and also led the team in interceptions in 1956. Kuhlmann received All-Big Eight Conference honors in 1957.

Kuhlmann also played catcher for the Missouri Tigers baseball team.  In 1958, he was named to the All College World Series team, helping the Tigers to a national runner-up finish.

Upon graduation from Missouri, Kuhlmann signed with the St. Louis Cardinals, spending four years in the minor leagues. He then returned to Missouri, where he served as an assistant coach under Devine before accompanying Devine to the Green Bay Packers and Notre Dame Fighting Irish.

In 2010, Kuhlmann was inducted into the University of Missouri Intercollegiate Athletics Hall of Fame.

Head coaching record

References

External links
 Pro Football Reference
 Baseball Reference

1937 births
Living people
American football fullbacks
Baseball catchers
Green Bay Packers coaches
Indianapolis Colts coaches
Missouri Tigers baseball players
Missouri Tigers football coaches
Missouri Tigers football players
Notre Dame Fighting Irish football coaches
Phoenix Cardinals coaches
St. Louis Cardinals (football) coaches
Tampa Bay Buccaneers coaches
People from Webster Groves, Missouri
Phoenix Cardinals head coaches